Rare-earth barium copper oxide (also referred to as ReBCO) is a family of chemical compounds known for exhibiting high temperature superconductivity (HTS). ReBCO superconductors have the potential to sustain stronger magnetic fields than other superconductor materials. 
Due to their high superconducting critical temperature and critical magnetic field, this class of materials are proposed for future use in technical applications where conventional low temperature superconductors do not suffice. This includes magnetic confinement fusion reactors such as the ARC reactor, allowing a more compact and potentially more economical construction, and superconducting magnets to use in future particle accelerators to come after the LHC at CERN which utilizes low temperature superconductors.

The most famous of these is yttrium barium copper oxide, YBa2Cu3O7−x (or Y123), the first superconductor found with a critical temperature above the boiling point of liquid nitrogen. Its molar ratio is 1 to 2 to 3 for yttrium, barium, and copper and it has a unit cell consisting of subunits, which is the typical structure of perovskites. In particular, the subunits are three, overlapping and containing an yttrium atom at the center of the middle one and a barium atom at the center of the remaining ones. Therefore, yttrium and barium are stacked according to the sequence [Ba-Y-Ba], along an axis conventionally denoted by c, (the vertical direction in the figure on the right).

The resulting cell has an orthorhombic structure, unlike other superconducting cuprates which generally have a tetragonal structure. All the corner sites of the unit cell are occupied by copper, which has two different coordinates, Cu(1) and Cu(2), with respect to oxygen. There are four possible crystallographic sites for oxygen: O(1), O(2), O(3), and O(4).

Any rare-earth element can be used in a ReBCO; popular choices include yttrium (YBCO), lanthanum (LBCO), samarium (Sm123), neodymium (Nd123 and Nd422), gadolinium (Gd123) and europium (Eu123), where the numbers among parenthesis indicate the molar ratio among rare-earth, barium and copper.

Because these kind of materials are brittle it was difficult to create wires from them. After 2010 industrial manufacturers started to produce tapes, with different layers encapsulating the ReBCO material and opening the way to commercial uses.

In September 2021 Commonwealth Fusion Systems (CFS) created a test magnet with ReBCO wires in which flowed a current of 40,000 amperes, with a magnetic field of 20 tesla at 20 K.

See also
 Cuprate superconductor
 List of superconductors

References

Barium compounds
Copper compounds
High-temperature superconductors
Oxides